The climate of Africa is a range of climates such as the equatorial climate, the tropical wet and dry climate, the tropical monsoon climate, the semi-arid climate (semi-desert and steppe), the desert climate (hyper-arid and arid), the humid subtropical climate, and the subtropical highland climate. Temperate climates are rare across the continent except at very high elevations and along the fringes. In fact, the climate of Africa is more variable by rainfall amount than by temperatures, which are consistently high. African deserts are the sunniest and the driest parts of the continent, owing to the prevailing presence of the subtropical ridge with subsiding, hot, dry air masses. Africa holds many heat-related records: the continent has the hottest extended region year-round, the areas with the hottest summer climate, the highest sunshine duration, and more.

Owing to Africa's position across equatorial and subtropical latitudes in both the northern and southern hemisphere, several different climate types can be found within it. The continent mainly lies within the intertropical zone between the Tropic of Cancer and the Tropic of Capricorn, hence its interesting density of humidity. Precipitation intensity is always high, and it is a hot continent. Warm and hot climates prevail all over Africa, but mostly the northern part is marked by aridity and high temperatures. Only the northernmost and the southernmost fringes of the continent have a Mediterranean climate. The equator runs through the middle of Africa, as do the Tropic of Cancer and the Tropic of Capricorn, making Africa the most tropical continent.

Temperatures 

Globally, heating of the earth near the equator leads to large amounts of upward motion and convection along the monsoon trough or Intertropical Convergence Zone. The divergence over the near-equatorial trough leads to air rising and moving away from the equator aloft. As it moves towards the Mid-Latitudes, the air cools and sinks, which leads to subsidence near the 30th parallel of both hemispheres. This circulation is known as the Hadley cell and leads to the formation of the subtropical ridge. Many of the world's deserts are caused by these climatological high-pressure areas, including the Sahara Desert.

Temperatures are hottest within the Sahara regions of Algeria and Mali, and coolest across the south and at elevation within the topography across the eastern and northwest sections of the continent. The hottest average temperature on Earth is at Dallol, Ethiopia, which averages a temperature of  throughout the year. This was later proven to be false, being derived from an inaccurate reading of a thermometer. The world's hottest place is in fact Death Valley, in California. Nevertheless, the major part of Africa experiences extreme heat during much of the year, especially the deserts, semi-deserts, steppes and savannas. The African deserts are arguably the hottest places on Earth, especially the Sahara Desert and the Danakil Desert, located in the Horn of Africa.

Wind 

The low-level easterly African jet stream is considered to play a crucial role in the southwest monsoon of Africa, and helps form the tropical waves which march across the tropical Atlantic and the eastern part of the Pacific during the warm season. The jet exhibits both barotropic and baroclinic instability, which produces synoptic-scale, westward-propagating disturbances in the jet known as African easterly waves, or tropical waves. A small number of mesoscale storm systems embedded in these waves develop into tropical cyclones after they move from west Africa into the tropical Atlantic, mainly during August and September. When the jet lies south of normal during the peak months of the Atlantic hurricane season, tropical cyclone formation is suppressed.

Precipitation

Great parts of North Africa and Southern Africa as well as the whole Horn of Africa mainly have a hot desert climate, or a hot semi-arid climate for the wetter locations. The Sahara Desert in North Africa is the largest hot desert in the world and is one of the hottest, driest and sunniest places on Earth. Located just south of the Sahara is a narrow semi-desert steppe (a semi-arid region) called the Sahel, while Africa's most southern areas contain both savanna plains, and its central portion contains very dense jungle (rainforest) regions. The equatorial region near the Intertropical Convergence Zone is the wettest portion of the continent. Annually, the rain belt across the continent moves northward into Sub-Saharan Africa by August, then passes back southward into south-central Africa by March. Areas with a savannah climate in Sub-Saharan Africa, such as Ghana, Burkina Faso, Darfur, Eritrea, Ethiopia, and Botswana have a distinct rainy season. El Nino results in drier-than-normal conditions in Southern Africa from December to February, and wetter-than-normal conditions in equatorial East Africa over the same period.

In Madagascar, trade winds bring moisture up the eastern slopes of the island, which is deposited as rainfall, and bring drier downsloped winds to areas south and west, leaving the western sections of the island in a rain shadow. This leads to significantly more rainfall over northeast sections of Madagascar than its southwestern portions. Southern Africa receives most of its rainfall from summer convective storms and with extratropical cyclones moving through the Westerlies. Once a decade, tropical cyclones lead to excessive rainfall across the region.

Snow and glaciers

Snow is an almost annual occurrence on some of the mountains of South Africa, including those of the Cedarberg and around Ceres in the South-Western Cape, and on the Drakensberg in Natal and Lesotho. Tiffendell Resort, in the Drakensberg, is the only commercial ski resort in South Africa, and has "advanced snow-making capability" allowing skiing for three months of the year. The Mountain Club of South Africa (MCSA) and the Mountain and Ski Club (MSC) of the University of Cape Town both have equipped ski huts in the Hex River mountains. Skiing including snowboarding in the Cape is a hit-and-miss affair, both in terms of timing of snowfalls, and whether there is sufficient snow to cover the rocks.

Table Mountain gets a light dusting of snow on the Front Table and also at Devil's Peak every few years. Snowfalls on Table Mountain took place on 20 September 2013; 30 August 2013; 5 August 2011; and on 15 June 2010.

Additionally, snow regularly falls in the Atlas Mountains in the Maghreb. Snowfall is also a regular occurrence at Mount Kenya and Mount Kilimanjaro in Tanzania.

There have been permanent glaciers on the Rwenzori Mountains, on the border of Uganda and the Democratic Republic of the Congo. However, by the 2010s, the glaciers were in retreat, and they are under threat of disappearing through rising temperatures.

Climate change 

In chapter 9 of the IPCC Sixth Assessment Report, it is reported that although greenhouse gas emissions are among the lowest in Africa, anthropogenic climate change has severely threatened daily life. People experience extreme food insecurity, high mortality rates, major biodiversity loss, and more as a result of global warming. Additionally, because of reduced economic activity and growth and inequities in funding, the ability for adaptation to these conditions is also reduced.

See also
Climate of South Africa
Earth rainfall climatology

References

External links
 Interactive Africa Koppen-Geiger Climate Classification Map